Kwik Trip is a chain of convenience stores founded in 1965 with locations throughout Michigan, Minnesota, South Dakota, and Wisconsin under the name Kwik Trip, and in Illinois and Iowa under the name Kwik Star (to avoid confusion with QuikTrip). The company also operates stores under the name Tobacco Outlet Plus, Tobacco Outlet Plus Grocery, Hearty Platter, Kwik Spirits, and Stop-N-Go. Kwik Trip, Inc. is a privately held company headquartered in La Crosse, Wisconsin.

Unlike many other convenience store chains, the company is vertically integrated across most of its product lines. It carries bagged milk and orange juice in pouches under the Nature's Touch brand via its in-house dairy. Kwik Trip also has an internal bakery operation which provides sliced and wrapped bread, doughnut and muffin products to its stores, along with a store brand snack line under the "Urge" branding. The company also maintains branding partnerships with several Upper Midwest professional sports teams, including Minnesota's Twins, Vikings, and Wild, along with the Green Bay Packers, Milwaukee Brewers, and Milwaukee Bucks (the latter featured as part of its chocolate milk line).

All locations have small grocery sections selling basic fruits, bread, canned food, frozen food, sliced cheeses, and ice cream, along with traditional convenience store food such as bottled drinks and hot dogs.  Notably, the chain has sold bananas, baking potatoes, and yellow onions for 39 cents per pound as a loss leader, along with fresh beef, hot dogs, bratwurst, and chicken. They also all have heated and ready-to-eat food, and will cook food to order off a small menu. In 2018, the company acquired the south-central Wisconsin chain PDQ, which offered fresh fried chicken in their stores; the PDQ recipe and chicken was slowly rolled out to select stores before being available at most locations. The next year, the chain began to offer home delivery of hot food in select markets through a partnership with EatStreet.

Stores located off major highway exits operate as full service truck stops, with dual-pump fuel islands. Many of the truck stop locations also have overnight parking, showers, and full-service Denny's restaurants. Automatic car washes are also available at many stores, with some restrictions on availability and hours due to local noise and environmental ordinances.

History 
Kwik Trip was founded in 1965 by the Hansen and Zietlow families in Eau Claire, Wisconsin. Over the next several years they added new locations surrounding Eau Claire.

The first La Crosse location opened in 1971, and in 1973, they built a distribution center and moved the headquarters to La Crosse. In the late 1970s and 1980s, Kwik Trip saw an influx in company growth; they had expanded the corporate offices three times, the distribution center twice, and hit the 100 stores mark in 1986.

In 1993, they opened their first location in Iowa under the name Kwik Star, and in 1997, Kwik Trip opened its first retail car wash which would soon become a staple for the brand. On January 1, 1999, Kwik Trip merged its petroleum, grocery, fresh delivery, and fleet maintenance departments to form its own transportation subsidiary, Convenience Transportation, LLC.

In 2000, the Zietlow family became the sole owner of Kwik Trip, Inc. The early 2000s also saw Kwik Trip's expansion on its grab-and-go food offerings, including the introduction of Glazers Donuts, the Hot Spot hot food program, and fresh food such as salads, produce, and sandwiches. By 2016, the chain had over 500 stores, all privately owned. In 2017, they acquired the chain PDQ, and in 2020, they acquired Stop–N–Go. On December 8, 2020 the first Kwik Star location opened in Illinois, a former Stop-N-Go store located in Rochelle.

In November 2021, plans were announced for a new stores in Brandon, South Dakota and Sioux Falls, South Dakota under the Kwik Star name. This location will mark the company's first locations in South Dakota. Additional stores are expected to open in the Sioux Falls area.

On January 1st, 2023, Kwik Trip CEO Don Zietlow retired to take care of his wife. Scott Zietlow, Don Zietlow's son and a former Mayo Clinic trauma surgeon, succeeded him as President and CEO.

Brands

Karuba 
A brand of in-store coffee that offers a variety of roasts ready to pour or to take home as pre-ground coffee bags. Kwik Trip also offers Karuba Gold, a line of specialty espresso drinks made-to-order by an automatic coffee machine.

Kitchen Cravings 
A brand of in-store food including prepackaged salads, sandwiches, yogurt parfaits, pizza, and Hot Spot food items. The brand also sells fresh steak, ground beef, and relabels fresh brats, hot dogs, and sausages produced by Bakalars Sausage Co. under this name.

Kwikery Bake Shop 
A brand of baked goods produced by Kwik Trip's bakery, including its popular Glazers donuts. The offerings include muffins, donuts, bagels, cookies, and a variety of sliced breads and buns.

Nature's Touch 
A brand of bottled water, juice, eggs, and dairy products. The dairy products are produced at Kwik Trip's own milk processing plant and include butter, ice cream, and milk. What is most notable about Nature's Touch milk is that aside from jugs, it is available in bags, which is a rarity in the United States.

Store operations
Kwik Trip stores employ a mixture of full-time, over-time and part-time employees. In addition to a store leader, each store employs an assistant store leader and about 3-5 guest service leaders. These employees are responsible for overseeing store operations while the store leader is out of the store. Additionally, each store has a food service leader and assistant food service leader responsible for overseeing the individual store's hot food program, ensuring that appropriate amounts of food are made and sold and the program continues to grow according to company expectations. District leaders supervise multiple stores in a given region, and zone leaders supervise multiple districts.

Workplace honors

In 2011, Kwik Trip was named by the Milwaukee Journal Sentinel as the number one large workplace (over 500 employees) for workers in Southeastern Wisconsin. Kwik Trip beat out Mortgage Guaranty Insurance Corporation (MGIC) for the first spot.

In 2018, Kwik Trip was honored as the 2018 Convenience Store Chain of the Year by Convenience Store Decisions.

In 2021, Kwik Trip was ranked #79 in Glassdoor's 2021 U.S. Best Places to Work. As a result, they were honored by Glassdoor with an Employees' Choice Award.

References

External links
	
Company Homepage 	
About Kwik Trip 	
Stop-n-Go information & locations 
American Marketing Association Collegiate Case Competition featuring Kwik Trip

La Crosse, Wisconsin
Retail companies based in Wisconsin
Privately held companies based in Wisconsin
Economy of the Midwestern United States
Convenience stores of the United States
Gas stations in the United States
Retail companies established in 1965
1965 establishments in Wisconsin